Gidget Goes to Rome is a 1963 Columbia Pictures Eastmancolor feature film starring Cindy Carol as the archetypal high school teen surfer girl originally portrayed by Sandra Dee in the 1959 film Gidget. The film is the third of three Gidget films directed by Paul Wendkos and expands upon Gidget's romance with boyfriend Moondoggie. The screenplay was written by Ruth Brooks Flippen based on characters created by Frederick Kohner. Veterans of previous Gidget films making appearances include James Darren as "Moondoggie", Joby Baker, and Jean "Jeff" Donnell as Gidget's mom, Mrs. Lawrence.

Plot
College-bound Gidget (Cindy Carol) is vacationing in Rome for the summer with faithful boyfriend Jeff, aka Moondoggie (James Darren) and their friends. Chaperoning the pair is Aunt Albertina (Jessie Royce Landis). However, Gidget's father Russell, worried about his daughter being abroad, asks an old friend of his, named Paolo Cellini, to keep an eye on Gidget to see that she stays out of trouble. Complications set in when Gidget begins to fall for the much older Paolo.

Cast

Production notes
The film was shot on location in Rome, Italy, with some scenes filmed on Italian beaches. In a parody of La Dolce Vita, Gidget attends a high society party and goes into the Trevi Fountain.

With Deborah Walley pregnant at the time of filming, Cindy Carol, who had previously acted under the name Carol Sydes took over the Gidget role and was signed to a Columbia Pictures contract.

Reception
Bosley Crowther noted in the New York Times of 12 September 1963, "When Gidget, played with the proper pout and correct ingenuousness by Cindy Caroll[sic], arrives in Rome with her group of happy friends, she is bound to fall in love with a married and handsome Italian magazine writer, enjoy such exotic delicacies as fettucini and chicken cacciatore, and experience the thrill of attending a 'Dolce Vita' cocktail party. As one of Gidget's friends explains, it's part of her 'growing up.' Gidget falls out of love in time...and all ends happily. Jeff sums up the entire experience in two immortal sentences: 'I guess everybody falls in love in Rome in the summer time. It's that old devil Italian moon.'"

See also
List of American films of 1963

References

External links

1963 films
1963 romantic comedy films
1960s teen films
American coming-of-age films
American musical comedy films
American romantic comedy films
American sequel films
American teen comedy films
American teen romance films
Columbia Pictures films
1960s English-language films
Films scored by John Williams
Films directed by Paul Wendkos
Films about vacationing
Films set in Rome
Films set in Italy
Films shot in Italy
Gidget films
1960s American films